Vice-Admiral Vicente Manuel de Moura Coutinho de Almeida d'Eça (31 July 1918 – 13 October 2018) was a Portuguese colonial administrator who served as the last Governor of Portuguese Cape Verde in 1974, and then its High Commissioner from December 1974 until its independence from Portugal in July 1975. Almeida turned 100 in July 2018 and died three months later.

External links
    Portuguese Naval Aviation
This Biography was part of a project by the Level 4 Students about Adm. Almeida d'Eça

References

1918 births
2018 deaths
Colonial heads of Cape Verde
Commanders of the Order of Aviz
Officers of the Legion of Merit
Men centenarians
Portuguese centenarians
Recipients of the Order of Naval Merit (Brazil)